The Proverbs of Alfred is a collection of early Middle English sayings ascribed to King Alfred the Great (called "England's darling"), said to have been uttered at an assembly in Seaford, East Sussex.  The collection of proverbs was probably put together in Sussex in the mid-12th century.  The manuscript evidence suggests the text originated at either a Cluniac or Benedictine monastery, either Lewes Priory,  to the north of Seaford, or Battle Abbey,  to the north-east.

Transmission
The Proverbs of Alfred survive in four manuscripts of the 13th century:

Cotton Galba A. xix (MS C)
Maidstone Museum A.13 (MS M)
Cambridge, Trinity College, B.14.39 (MS T)
Oxford, Jesus College, 29 (MS J)

The text appears to have been produced in the late 12th century. There is no reason to suppose that any of the proverbs go back to King Alfred. King Alfred, who translated several works into the vernacular, is not known to have translated or composed proverbs. However, his legendary status in later tradition gave him a reputation for having done so, as the Middle English poem The Owl and the Nightingale likewise suggests. Some of the proverbs in the Proverbs of Alfred appear elsewhere under another name (Hendyng, which may itself be less of a proper name than an adjective).

Form and contents
The proverbs are in alliterative verse, but the verse does not adhere to the rules of classical Old English poetry. Caesurae are present in every line, but the lines are broken in two (cf. Pearl).  The collection shows signs of transition in verse form from the earlier Anglo-Saxon alliterative form to the new Norman rhyme form, for rhyme occasionally occurs in the poetry.  Late in the poem, the verse even picks up Norman metre and something like a couplet form.  At the same time, the proverbs resemble the gnomic compositions of earlier Anglo-Saxon instruction.  The proverbs are expressed as highly compressed metaphors that are halfway to the poetry found in the Anglo-Saxon riddle and Gnomic Verses.  Collections of sayings and precepts were common in Latin as well, but the distinctive compression of the Alfredian proverbs is clearly a sign of their Anglo-Saxon origin.

Given that it is most likely that the author and his antecedents gathered up proverbs over time, the heterogeneous contents of the book are predictable. The proverbs contain popular wisdom, religious instruction, and advice on the wickedness of women. The latter is most likely a scribal interpolation.

Sample
An example of the Proverbs is lines 423–48, here in the translation of Christopher Cannon.

References

Sources
Keynes, Simon, and Lapidge, Michael, Alfred the Great: Asser's Life of King Alfred & Other Contemporary Sources. Penguin Classics, 1984.

Further reading
Arngart, Olaf (ed.). The Proverbs of Alfred. 2 vols. Lund, 1942–55.
Anderson, O.S. The Proverbs of Alfred, 1: A study of the texts. Lund and London, 1942.
Arngart, Olaf. The Distichs of Cato and the Proverbs of Alfred. Lund, 1952.
Arngart, Olaf (ed. and tr.).  The Proverbs of Alfred. An Emended Text. Lund, 1978.
Rouse, Robert Allen. The idea of Anglo-Saxon England in Middle English romance. Woodbridge: D.S. Brewer, 2005. Especially chapter 2.  .

External links
The Cambridge History of English Literature

1250s
13th century
Middle English literature
Old English literature
English proverbs
Alfred the Great